An air gun is a gun which fires projectiles by means of compressed air or other gas.

Air gun may also refer to:
Air gun (seismic), an energy source used in reflection seismology
Air vortex cannon, a toy that fires air vortices at a target
Airsoft gun, a very low-power replica toy gun
BB gun, an air gun designed to fire spherical projectiles
Heat gun, a hot air device
Impact wrench, also known as air gun, air wrench, impactor, rattle gun, or torque gun

See also
Air cannon (disambiguation)